Mordellistena fuscocastanea is a beetle in the genus Mordellistena of the family Mordellidae. It was described in 1952 by Ermisch.

References

fuscocastanea
Beetles described in 1952